The 2019–20 Ohio Valley Conference men's basketball season will be the 71st season of Ohio Valley Conference men's basketball. began with practices in October 2018, followed by the start of the 2019–20 NCAA Division I men's basketball season on November 5, 2019. Conference play will begin January 2, 2019 and conclude on  February 29, 2020. The 2020 Ohio Valley Conference men's basketball tournament will be held March 4–7 at the Ford Center in Evansville, Indiana.

Preseason

Preseason Poll
The 2019 preseason poll was determined at the conference's media day on October 22, 2019, at the Ford Center in Evansville, Indiana.

Preseason All-OVC Team
The pre-season all-OVC team was also selected at media day. The first player in bold is the preseason player of the year.

All-Conference Teams and Awards

References